Push the Button may refer to:

 Push the Button (Money Mark album), 1998
 Push the Button (The Chemical Brothers album), 2005
 "Push the Button" (Sugababes song), 2005
 "Push the Button" (Teapacks song), 2007, Israeli Eurovision song
 Ant & Dec's Push the Button, a British game show
 "Push the Button", a song by Amy Lee from Aftermath
 "Computer Age (Push the Button)", a 1984 song by Newcleus